Unto the Third Generation is a 1913 American short silent romantic drama directed by Harry Solter. The film starred Earle Foxe and Florence Lawrence and Matt Moore in the lead roles. It was the third time director Harry Solter had worked together with Foxe and Lawrence that year, previously working together on His Wife's Child and The Spender.

The film was written by Walter MacNamara.

Cast
Florence Lawrence
Matt Moore
Earle Foxe
Jack Newton 
Leonora von Ottinger
Percy Standing
Joseph MacDonald 
Frank Bennett
Frank Emmet

External links

Films directed by Harry Solter
1913 films
American silent short films
American romantic drama films
1913 romantic drama films
1913 short films
American black-and-white films
1910s American films
Silent romantic drama films
Silent American drama films